My 10th Anniversary with Dot Records is an album by Pat Boone, released in 1965 on Dot Records.

Track listing

References 

1965 albums
Pat Boone albums
Dot Records albums
Albums produced by Randy Wood (record producer)